The women's pentathlon event at the 2019 European Athletics Indoor Championships was held on 1 March.

Medalists

Records

Results

60 metres hurdles

High jump

Shot put

Long jump

800 metres

Final standings

References

2019 European Athletics Indoor Championships
Combined events at the European Athletics Indoor Championships